"Over You" is a song written and composed by Jerry Fuller and recorded by Gary Puckett & The Union Gap for their 1968 album, Incredible.

Song Background
The selection was the group's fourth consecutive million-selling Gold-certified single to have been produced, composed, and written by Jerry Fuller. It received a Gold disc from the RIAA in December 1968. Al Capps drafted the arrangements for the stringed instruments played on the song.

Chart performance
In the US, the song reached No. 7 on the Billboard Hot 100 chart in late 1968, and on other charts, it peaked at  No. 3 on the Adult Contemporary chart, and peaked at No. 5 in Cash Box as well as.  Outside the, US, "over You" was an international success, reaching No. 3 in Canada, No. 6 in Australia, and No. 17 in New Zealand.
It ranked No. 41 on the US Cashbox chart Top 100 Hits of 1968.

References

1968 singles
1968 songs
Gary Puckett & The Union Gap songs
Songs written by Jerry Fuller
Columbia Records singles
Song recordings produced by Jerry Fuller